Brendon Dedekind (born 14 February 1976 in Pietermaritzburg, KwaZulu-Natal) is a South African retired swimmer. He won an international championship gold medal in the 50 m freestyle at the 1999 Pan Pacific Swimming Championships. Nicknamed Skinny Man, he competed in two consecutive Summer Olympics for his native country, starting in 1996, when he was a finalist in the 50 m freestyle.

See also
 List of Commonwealth Games medallists in swimming (men)

References
 

1976 births
Living people
Sportspeople from Pietermaritzburg
South African male freestyle swimmers
Swimmers at the 1996 Summer Olympics
Swimmers at the 2000 Summer Olympics
Olympic swimmers of South Africa
Swimmers at the 1998 Commonwealth Games
Commonwealth Games silver medallists for South Africa
South African male swimmers
Medalists at the FINA World Swimming Championships (25 m)
Commonwealth Games medallists in swimming
Alumni of Maritzburg College
African Games gold medalists for South Africa
African Games medalists in swimming
Universiade medalists in swimming
Competitors at the 1999 All-Africa Games
Universiade bronze medalists for South Africa
Medalists at the 1997 Summer Universiade
20th-century South African people
21st-century South African people
Medallists at the 1998 Commonwealth Games